Agulla may refer to:

People
Belisario Agulla (born 1988), Argentine rugby union player
Horacio Agulla, Argentine rugby union player

Other uses
Agulla (snakefly), a snakefly genus
Agulla, an element of a castell (a human tower)
Cala Agulla, a beach in Majorca